The Habit of Happiness is a 1916 American silent comedy film directed by Allan Dwan and filmed by cinematographer Victor Fleming. The film was written by Allan Dwan and Shannon Fife from a suggestion by D. W. Griffith and stars Douglas Fairbanks. A 16mm print of the film is preserved in a private collection.

Cast
 Douglas Fairbanks as Sunny Wiggins
 George Fawcett as Jonathan Pepper
 Macey Harlam as Foster 
 Dorothy West as Elsie Pepper
 George Backus as Mr. Wiggins
 Grace Rankin as Clarice Wiggins
  William Jefferson (actor) as Jones
 Margery Wilson - Unconfirmed role
 Adolphe Menjou as Society Man (uncredited)

Production notes
The Habit of Happiness was produced by The Fine Arts Film Company and distributed by Triangle Film Corporation. It was shot at the Riverdale Studios in Fort Lee, New Jersey.

Reception
The Moving Picture World, March 25, 1916:

The Postal Record, 1916:

Woman's Home Companion, June, 1916:

References

External links

1916 films
1916 comedy films
Silent American comedy films
American silent feature films
American black-and-white films
Films directed by Allan Dwan
Films shot in Fort Lee, New Jersey
Triangle Film Corporation films
1910s American films
1910s English-language films